Stages is an album by Elaine Paige, released in 1983 on the Warner Music and K-tel labels and has been re-issued on CD. The album charted in the UK album charts at #2 in 1983.

Background 
Stages was the first of a number of Paige's recordings to be produced by Tony Visconti, who had previously worked with David Bowie, The Moody Blues and Mary Hopkin. It featured a number of songs from musicals including tracks from shows in which she had appeared.

Production 
The album was primarily recorded at Visconti's Good Earth Studios other than for the track "Tomorrow" which was taped at Olympic Studios. The track "Don't Cry for Me Argentina" was taken from the 1978 original London cast recording of Evita.

Out-Takes
In 2014, Rhino UK released on the compilation album Elaine Paige - The Ultimate Collection the out-take "It's Raining on Prom Night" (from the musical Grease) which was originally recorded as part of the Stages album sessions.

Other Releases
Released in Australia by K-tel: NA680.

In 1987, Atlantic released the album in the US. The tracklisting was amended to open with "On My Own" from Les Misérables, which opened on Broadway that year. "Running Back for More" was therefore omitted.

Track listing
 "Memory" - 4:09 (Andrew Lloyd Webber, T.S. Eliot, Trevor Nunn) - from the musical Cats
 "Be On Your Own" - 2:43 (Maury Yeston) - from the musical Nine
 "Another Suitcase in Another Hall" - 3:23 (Andrew Lloyd Webber, Tim Rice) - from the musical Evita
 "Send in the Clowns" - 4:09 (Stephen Sondheim, Tom Bahler) - from the musical A Little Night Music
 "Running Back for More" - 3:14 (Tim Rice, Stephen Oliver) - from the musical Blondel 
 "Good Morning Starshine" - 2:55 (James Rado, Gerome Ragni, Galt MacDermot) - from the musical Hair 
 "Don't Cry for Me Argentina" - 5:38 (Andrew Lloyd Webber, Tim Rice) - from the musical Evita 
 "I Don't Know How to Love Him" - 3:50 (Andrew Lloyd Webber, Tim Rice) - from the musical Jesus Christ Superstar 
 "What I Did for Love" - 3:25 (Marvin Hamlisch, Edward Kleban) - from the musical A Chorus Line 
 "One Night Only" - 3:09 (Tom Eyen, Henry Krieger) - from the musical Dreamgirls 
 "Losing My Mind" - 3:35 (Stephen Sondheim) - from the musical Follies 
 "Tomorrow" - 2:42 (Martin Charnin, Charles Strouse) - from the musical Annie

Charts

Certifications and sales

Personnel

Musicians 
 Elaine Paige - lead and backing vocals
 Graham Ward - drums
 Phil Cranham - bass guitar
 Mitch Dalton - guitar
 Robin Smith - keyboards, synthesizers, Fender Rhodes
 Hugh Burns - guitars
 Derek Bramble - bass guitar
 Andy Duncan - drums, percussion
 Mark Williamson - backing vocals
 Tony Visconti - backing vocals
 Annie McGaig - backing vocals
 Maureen Turner - backing vocals
 Mary Hopkin - backing vocals
 John Du Prez - flugelhorn
 David Bitelli - saxophone
 John Thirkell - trumpet, flugelhorn
 Paul Spong - trumpet, flugelhorn
 Spike Edney - trombone

Production credits
 Producer - Tony Visconti
 Engineers - Chris Porter, Bryan Evans and Keith Grant
 Rhythm Track Arrangements - Robin Smith
 Orchestral Arrangements - Tony Visconti

References

1983 albums
Elaine Paige albums
Albums produced by Tony Visconti